Mionochroma novella is a species of beetle in the family Cerambycidae. It was described by Bates in 1885. It is known from Nicaragua and Panama.

References

Cerambycinae
Beetles described in 1885